Keybar Rural District is a rural district (dehestan) in Jolgeh Zozan District, Khaf County, Razavi Khorasan province, Iran. At the 2006 census, its population was 8,934, in 1,948 families.  The rural district has 20 villages.

References 

Rural Districts of Razavi Khorasan Province
Khaf County